Emamzadeh Davud (also Romanized as Emāmzādeh Dāvūd and Emāmzādeh Dāvod; also known as Keykāv-e Emāmzādeh Dāvūd) is a village in Sulqan Rural District, Kan District, Tehran County, Tehran Province, Iran. At the 2006 census, its population was 179, in 50 families.

References 

Populated places in Tehran County